The Ingakslugwat Hills volcanic field is in the Yukon–Kuskokwim Delta in western Alaska. They most likely formed by the interaction of permafrost with magma, seeing as they have a hydrovolcanic nature despite being high above the water table.

The volcanoes rise  over the surrounding plains and often contain small crater lakes. The height of the cones ranges . The volcanoes were active between 1 million and 700,000 years ago, but the latest activity may be of Holocene age. The volcanoes are formed by basaltic rocks. Other Quaternary volcanic centres in the region are Nelson Island and the Kusilvak Mountains.

Olivine basalt is the principal volcanic rock but basanite and nephelinite are also found.

References

Sources 

 

Landforms of Bethel Census Area, Alaska
Cinder cones of the United States
Volcanoes of Alaska
Landforms of Kusilvak Census Area, Alaska
Volcanoes of Unorganized Borough, Alaska